Marie-Berthe Cazin (born 16 August 1872 in Boulogne-sur-Mer (Pas-de-Calais)); died 1 June 1971 in Sèvres (Hauts-de-Seine))  was a French woman painter, potter, goldsmith.

Biography 
Marie-Berthe Cazin (née Yvart) was married to Jean-Marie Michel Cazin, and studied with her father, Jean-Charles Cazin. She produced mostly decorative works, such as vases and plates, working in ceramic, hammered copper and silver, leather, horn and other.

It is believed that she worked alongside Jean-Michel throughout his entire career in ceramics and that many of the vases signed Jean-Michel were actually made by Berthe. At some point she began to sign her ceramic work, which typically feature incised and relief floral decoration.

In 1913 she participated in the exposition with Henriette Tirman in Lyceum-Club.

References

Notes 
 Bénézit, 1999: CAZIN, Marie Berthe (1872-1971)

1872 births
1971 deaths
French potters
19th-century French painters
20th-century French painters
School of Paris
Women potters
20th-century French women artists
19th-century French women artists
French ceramists
French women ceramists